Öykü Serter (born 26 February 1975) is a Turkish TV presenter, actress and DJ.

Career 
She entered the media sector as a DJ at Capital Radio. She later took charge of the program 5T5 on Number 1 FM and Cine5. She later served as the presenter of a number of programs, including Biri Bizi Gözetliyor, Akademi Türkiye and Anadolu Rüzgarı. In 2006, together with Ragga Oktay, Serter presented the contestant B.U.M.. In 2011, she began presenting the singing contest Star Akademi, with Ajda Pekkan, Ertuğrul Özkök and Sertab Erener as the judges. In 2014, she presented Bu Tarz Benim, followed by İşte Benim Stilim, Rising Star Türkiye and Fenomen in 2015. In March 2016, she appeared on the cover of Elele magazine.

Filmography 
As presenter

As actress

Awards

References

External links 
 

1975 births
Turkish DJs
Turkish television actresses
Turkish television presenters
Living people
Actresses from Ankara
21st-century Turkish actresses
Golden Butterfly Award winners